Valérie Létard (born 13 October 1962 in Orchies, Nord) is a French politician of the Union of Democrats and Independents (UDI) who served as Secretary of State for Solidarity in the government of François Fillon from 2007 to 2010.

Political career

Member of the Senate, 2008–present 
Since 10 April 2008, Létard has been the President of the Valenciennes Agglomeration Community, elected with 83 percent of the vote.

Career in government 
Létard served in the government of Prime Minister François Fillon under President of France Nicolas Sarkozy, first as Secretary of State for Solidarity (2007-2009) and later for Climate (2009-2010). During her time in office, she launched the government’s campaign in 2009 to warn potential victims of forced marriages and female genital mutilation.

Later career
On 1 October 2011 Létard was a candidate for the Presidency of the Senate, against the outgoing president, Gérard Larcher (UMP) and Jean-Pierre Bel (PS). She received 29 votes.

Ahead of the Republicans’ 2016 primaries, Létard endorsed Alain Juppé as the party’s candidate for 2017 presidential elections. In March 2017, in the context of the Fillon affair, she called on LR candidate François Fillon to withdraw his candidacy.

Following the 2017 legislative elections, Létard reportedly refused offers to become Minister of Housing and Urban Affairs in Prime Minister Édouard Philippe’s government. On 4 October 2017 she was elected Vice-President of the French Senate instead, under the leadership of Gérard Larcher.

References

External links 
 Official web site of Valérie Létard
 Her biography on the web site of the French Senate

1962 births
Living people
People from Nord (French department)
Social Democratic Party (France) politicians
Union for French Democracy politicians
French Senators of the Fifth Republic
The Centrists politicians
Women members of the Senate (France)
21st-century French women politicians
Union of Democrats and Independents politicians
Women government ministers of France
Senators of Nord (French department)
Politicians from Hauts-de-France